Ell–Saline USD 307 is a public unified school district headquartered in Brookville, Kansas, United States.  The district includes the communities of Brookville, Bavaria, Hedville, Shipton, and nearby rural areas.

Schools
The school district operates the following schools:
 Ell-Saline Jr/Sr High School - 7th to 12th - 414 E Anderson St, Brookville.
 Ell-Saline Elementary School - PreK to 6th - 1757 N Halstead Rd (northwest of Salina at Stimmel Rd intersection)

Academic achievement
In 2018, 25.9 percent of the students tested had an effective or excellent ability to understand and use the mathematics skills and knowledge needed for college and career readiness. In the same year 34.81 percent of the students tested had an effective or excellent ability to understand and use the English Language arts skills and knowledge needed for college and career readiness.

See also
 Kansas State Department of Education
 Kansas State High School Activities Association
 List of high schools in Kansas
 List of unified school districts in Kansas

References

External links
 

School districts in Kansas
Education in Saline County, Kansas